Matthias Behr (born 1 April 1955 in Tauberbischofsheim, Baden-Württemberg) is a former German foil fencer. He won a gold medal and three silvers at three Olympic Games.

Biography
Matthias Behr attended the Kaufmännische Schule Tauberbischofsheim and fought for the Fencing-Club Tauberbischofsheim. Matthias Behr is married to the former foil fencer Zita Funkenhauser. After termination of his career as a competitive athlete, he became principal of the part-time boarding school at the Olympic base of Tauberbischofsheim.

During his career as a fencer, he was part of a group of foil fencers from Tauberbischofsheim, or from the competitive centre there, who dominated their field nationally and internationally for almost 15 years.

On 19 July 1982, in the middle of his career, Matthias Behr, and foil fencing in general, became widely known outside of those interested in the sport, due to a deadly accident at the world championship in Rome, when Behr's blade broke and fatally injured the most successful foil fencer of the time and incumbent world champion, 28-year-old Soviet Ukrainian Vladimir Smirnov, in the head.

Matthias Behr was one of the close confidants of Emil Beck and became his successor as team leader of the National German Fencing Team.

Singles successes 
1984 Silver Summer Olympics, Los Angeles
1987 Silver FIE World Championships in Fencing, Lausanne

Team successes 
1973 Silver FIE World Championships in Fencing, Gothenburg
1976 Gold Summer Olympics, Montreal
1977 Gold FIE World Championships in Fencing, Buenos Aires
1979 Bronze FIE World Championships in Fencing, Melbourne
1981 Bronze FIE World Championships in Fencing, Clermont-Ferrand
1983 Gold FIE World Championships in Fencing, Vienna
1984 Silver Summer Olympics, Los Angeles
1985 Silver FIE World Championships in Fencing, Barcelona
1986 Silver FIE World Championships in Fencing, Sofia
1987 Gold World Championships, Lausanne
1988 Silver Summer Olympics, Seoul

Awards 
 Silbernes Lorbeerblatt

References

External links 

(In German)
  - Ein tödlicher Stich und viele Wunden (A deadly stab and many wounds) (FAZ)
  - Differenzen um Teamchefposten (Misunderstandings concerning the position of the team leader) (Die Welt)

1955 births
Living people
People from Tauberbischofsheim
Sportspeople from Stuttgart (region)
German male fencers
Olympic fencers of West Germany
Fencers at the 1976 Summer Olympics
Fencers at the 1984 Summer Olympics
Fencers at the 1988 Summer Olympics
Olympic gold medalists for West Germany
Olympic silver medalists for West Germany
Olympic medalists in fencing
Medalists at the 1976 Summer Olympics
Medalists at the 1984 Summer Olympics
Medalists at the 1988 Summer Olympics